Murray Chatlain (born January 19, 1963) is a Canadian prelate of the Roman Catholic Church, who (as of 2012) serves as Archbishop of Keewatin-Le Pas.

Biography
Murray Chatlain was born on January 19, 1963, in Saskatoon, Saskatchewan.  He completed baccalaureate studies at the University of Saskatchewan and earned the M.Div. degree at St. Peter's Seminary in London, Ontario.

In 1987 Chatlain was ordained a priest for Diocese of Saskatoon; in subsequent years he served parishes in that diocese and within the Diocese of Mackenzie-Fort Smith.

Pope Benedict XVI appointed Chatlain as coadjutor bishop of Mackenzie-Fort Smith in June 2007. Chatlain was consecrated in September of that year, and he succeeded Bishop Denis Croteau, O.M.I. as ordinary upon the latter's retirement in May 2008.

Benedict XVI appointed Chatlain archbishop of Keewatin-Le Pas on December 6, 2012. His installation as the sixth bishop of the Archdiocese took place on March 19, 2013, the same day as the inauguration in Vatican City of the reign of Pope Francis.

Chatlain has studied the Dene aboriginal language and is a member of the Canadian Catholic Aboriginal Council and Co-Chair of Our Lady of Guadalupe Circle, an Indigenous Catholic Coalition.

References

External links

Reference page at catholic-hierarchy.org

1963 births
Living people
21st-century Roman Catholic archbishops in Canada
People from Saskatoon
St. Peter's Seminary (Diocese of London, Ontario) alumni
Roman Catholic bishops of Mackenzie–Fort Smith
Roman Catholic archbishops of Keewatin–Le Pas